McClellan Ranch Preserve is a public preserve located in the Monta Vista neighborhood of Cupertino that still retains its rural ranch look. It used to be a horse ranch owed by the McClellan family in the 1930s, and still preserves the original ranch house, a working milk barn and livestock barn, and a replica blacksmiths shop, along with a natural reserve in the middle of the park. A famous birding hot spot, the ranch park also houses the headquarters of the Santa Clara Valley Audubon Society and a nature museum and environmental education center.

The preserve received its current name in 2012, when the City of Cupertino renamed what was then McClellan Ranch Park, in order to respect the land's original designation as a preserve.

The McClellan Ranch maintains a sedate and scenic trail along the meandering Stevens Creek, which flows from the park to Blackberry Farm. The Master Gardeners program of the Santa Clara County also conducts vegetable trials on the Community Farm situated on the ranch.

References

Cupertino, California
Municipal parks in California
Parks in the San Francisco Bay Area
Parks in Santa Clara County, California
Nature centers in California